"The Chance of a Lunchtime" is an episode of the BBC sitcom Only Fools and Horses. It was the second episode of series 7, and first broadcast on 6 January 1991. In the episode, Raquel auditions for a role in a Shakespeare play. Elsewhere, Del tries to sell musical national anthem doorbells.

Synopsis
Raquel has been offered the chance to really get her acting career off the ground by auditioning for the part of Rosalind in Shakespeare's As You Like It, and Del Boy is behind her all the way for it.

Meanwhile, Del, knowing that Rodney has not spoken to Cassandra since she got back from her holiday, goes round to see her, as well as to fix the door to their flat. Del then tells Cassandra that Rodney wants to meet up with her tonight at a little restaurant in Wapping at 7.30pm, Cassandra agrees to the date and time.

Later, back at Nelson Mandela House, Del promises to help Raquel rehearse. Just then, Rodney is about to open the front door when Del urges him to ring the doorbell. Rodney does so, and the "Star-Spangled Banner" (which Del refers to as the French National Anthem by saying "Viva France") plays, because Del has just installed his latest item to flog: the Anthachime, a doorbell that plays 36 different national anthems. Del then tells Rodney the same thing he told Cassandra: meeting up at the restaurant in Wapping at 7.30pm, Rodney also agrees to the date and time.

Sometime later at the Nag's Head, Del fails to convince Mike to buy an Anthachime, but has better luck when Trigger buys one. Marlene and Boycie, along with their son Tyler, enter. Boycie complains about how many toys Marlene is spoiling Tyler with. Marlene asks Del if he misses Rodney since he married Cassandra and went to work for her father's printing firm, and Del admits to it. Marlene takes Tyler and leaves. As Boycie waves to his son, Del, Mike, and Trigger do so as well, much to Boycie's annoyance, as Marlene had said "Wave goodbye to your Daddy".

Meanwhile, at the restaurant in Wapping, Rodney and Cassandra both show up, and their chat gets off to a rocky start by mentioning the events of "Rodney Come Home", but eventually, they both make up after realising that Del was the one who really set all this up. They decide not to eat, and just decide to head back to their flat.

Back at the Nag's Head, a drunken 38-year-old peroxide blonde woman, who wants a taxi to Battersea, throws herself all over Del, who barely remembers her as Trudy, a former fiancée of his. Rodney enters to tell Del the good news about his date with Cassandra, as well as mention that he saw Raquel and Albert getting off a bus. This worries Del, so he asks Rodney to take Trudy to her taxi. Outside, Rodney tries to keep Trudy from falling down, but Cassandra, of course, drives by, sees what is happening, thinks Rodney and Trudy are kissing, and speeds off into the night in a huff. Rodney races back to his flat, fails to open the door, and rings the doorbell which plays the French National Anthem, before walking back to Nelson Mandela House.

Back at Trotter Towers, Rodney returns to the flat dejected with the bad news, as Del Boy and Raquel rehearse. As Raquel continues her rehearsal in the bedroom, Del admits that he didn't know Cassandra would see Rodney with Trudy. Just then, Alan phones the flat, asking for Rodney. Del tells him that Rodney's asleep, and subsequently tells his younger brother that his father-in-law wants to see him in work tomorrow, first thing in the morning. Del follows Raquel into the bedroom, as Rodney worries that Alan is going to fire him. Albert then tells yet another war story about a chief communications officer on board, Tubby Fox, who was a real party animal who got in trouble for bringing a Maltese girl onto the ship. The captain put Tubby on a charge and started court-martial proceedings. But Tubby resigned his commission, which meant the ship could not sail, and the captain had no choice but to refuse to accept Tubby's resignation. Once he had done that, the court martial was deemed null and void. What Albert's trying to say is that Rodney should realise his own importance. This makes Rodney more relieved with his situation, so he thanks his uncle and goes off to bed.

However, Rodney has misunderstood Albert's story, and assumes Albert is suggesting that Rodney ought to hand in his resignation, as Alan cannot afford to lose Rodney, and thus will not fire him. The next day, at Parry Print Ltd, Rodney enters Alan's office and leaves an envelope on his desk. Alan enters all happy and excited, because he has got the three-year contract from a mail-order company, earning the company a fortune. Meanwhile, Del and Raquel have lunch with Adrian, the director of the play, and his gay partner, Jules (Paul Opacic).

Later that day, back at Trotter Towers, Rodney – who in his excitement about the new contract has forgotten about the letter he wrote to Alan – is shocked to find out that Alan has cheerfully accepted his letter of resignation without bothering to inquire why Rodney is resigning, and replaced him with a dim-witted teenager named Elvis. Del is furious at Rodney's immaturity, and tells him now he has got no wife, no home, and no job (even though he and Albert are the sole cause of this).

Much later that night, Raquel glumly tells Del that the Shakespeare play is a tour around schools, and that she turned it down because she's pregnant. Del is delighted to hear the news and also tells Albert and Rodney, thus quoting "How many people do you see there? ...I see two." causing Rodney to turn round to Uncle Albert and say, "You know what this means, Unc? Either Raquel's pregnant or Del's pissed." Del and Raquel then embrace.

Episode cast

Story arc
Raquel mentions that she was married to a police officer. It would later be revealed in "The Class of '62" that her ex-husband is former-DCI Roy Slater.

Music
 Lisa Stansfield: "All Around the World"
 The Style Council: "Promised Land"
 Roxy Music: "Do the Strand"
 Joan Armatrading: "Love and Affection"
 Guitar Moods: "Old Friends"
 Betty Boo: "Where Are You Baby?"
 Billy Idol: "Eyes Without a Face"
 Swing Out Sister: "Masquerade"

External links

Only Fools and Horses (series 7) episodes
1991 British television episodes